Gerry Stahl is an American computer scientist specializing in  computer-supported collaborative learning. He is professor emeritus of computing and informatics at Drexel University, and was the founding editor-in-chief of the International Journal of Computer-Supported Collaborative Learning.

Education and career
Stahl studied philosophy and mathematics at the Massachusetts Institute of Technology, graduating in 1967. While supporting himself with work as a systems programmer, he completed a Ph.D. in philosophy at Northwestern University in 1975, with a dissertation on the philosophy of Heidegger and Marx. After returning to graduate study at the University of Colorado Boulder, he completed a second Ph.D. in computer science there in 1993.

After working for several years as a researcher at the university and various software firms, he became an associate professor at Drexel University in 2002. He was given tenure there in 2008, and promoted to full professor in 2012. He retired as professor emeritus in 2014.

He is the founding editor-in-chief of the International Journal of Computer-Supported Collaborative Learning, an official journal of the International Society of the Learning Sciences, which published its first issue in 2006. He stepped down as editor-in-chief in 2016.

Books
Stahl is the author of books including:
 Group Cognition: Computer Support for Building Collaborative Knowledge (MIT Press, 2006)
 Studying Virtual Math Teams (Springer, 2009)
 Translating Euclid: Designing a Human-Centered Mathematics (Morgan & Claypool, 2013)
 Constructing Dynamic Triangles Together: The Development of Mathematical Group Cognition (Cambridge University Press, 2016)
 Theoretical Investigations: Philosophical Foundations of Group Cognition (Springer, 2021)

References

External links
 Home page
 

Living people
American computer scientists
American cognitive scientists
Massachusetts Institute of Technology alumni
Northwestern University alumni
University of Colorado Boulder alumni
Drexel University faculty
1945 births